Gimme Shelter is a compilation album by The Rolling Stones, released on Decca Records in 1971. It reached number 19 on the UK Albums Chart.

This is not a soundtrack album from the film of the same name. Side one is composed of previously released studio recordings from 1968 and 1969. Side two consists of tracks previously released on the US live album Got Live If You Want It! in 1966.

Track listing
All tracks composed by Mick Jagger and Keith Richards except where noted.

Side one
"Jumpin' Jack Flash"
"Love in Vain" (Robert Johnson)
"Honky Tonk Women"
"Street Fighting Man"
"Sympathy for the Devil"
"Gimme Shelter"

Side two
"Under My Thumb"
"Time Is on My Side" (Norman Meade)
"I've Been Loving You Too Long" (Otis Redding, Jerry Butler)
"Fortune Teller" (Naomi Neville)
"Lady Jane"
"(I Can't Get No) Satisfaction"

References

Albums produced by Andrew Loog Oldham
The Rolling Stones compilation albums
1971 compilation albums
Decca Records compilation albums
Albums produced by Jimmy Miller
1971 live albums
Decca Records live albums
The Rolling Stones live albums